Pitasakwala Abirahasa (The Mystery of Extraterrestrial) is a 2011 Sri Lankan Sinhala thriller fantasy & Science fiction film directed by debutant director Nirmal Rajapakse and produced by Nirmal Rajapakse himself along with NFC Films. It stars almost all newcomers in to cinema, including Lasantha Kamalsiri, Shamila Vijini in lead roles along with Vimukthi Udara and Maduri Poornima. Music and special sounds effects co-composed by Kaushal Stanley and Sudesh Nissanka. It is the 1152nd Sri Lankan film in the Sinhala cinema.

Plot

Cast
 Lasantha Kamalsiri as Lasantha
 Shamila Vijini as Piyumi
 Vimukthi Udara as Milan
 Maduri Poornima
 Arosha Kanchana
 Randhika Nuwan as Damith
 Anjula Gamage
 Thilina Anuradha as Asela
 Chamila Dhananjani
Dubbing artistes
 Bimba Darshi as Piyumi
 Lionel Gunaratne as Alien
 Achini Bandaranayake as Lakshika

References

2011 films
2010s Sinhala-language films